The Phantom Musketeer (Italian: Il Moschettiere fantasma) is a 1952 Italian historical adventure film directed by Max Calandri and starring Vasito Bastino, Tamara Lees, Rossana Podestà and Clara Calamai.  The film's sets were designed by the art director Nino Maccarones.

Cast
 Vasito Bastino as Claudio Venier
 Tamara Lees as Sibilla
 Rossana Podestà as Ornella
 Clara Calamai as Marina Venier
 Elio Steiner as inquisitore Badoero
 Isa Pola as contessa Ferrer
 Gianni Rizzo as Pierre de La Tour
 Carlo Ninchi as doge Donato
 Inge Borg as suor Angelica

References

Bibliography 
 Chiti, Roberto & Poppi, Roberto. Dizionario del cinema italiano: Dal 1945 al 1959. Gremese Editore, 1991.
 Dalmonte, Rossana & Baroni, Mario. Bruno Maderna: His Life and Music. Rowman & Littlefield, 2022.

External links
 

1952 films
1950s Italian-language films
Italian adventure films
1952 adventure films
Italian black-and-white films
1950s Italian films
Italian historical films
1950s historical films
Films set in the 17th century